John J. Supulski (1917 - June 7, 1985), sometimes referred to as "John-John", was an American football player.  

Supulki grew up in Kingston, Pennsylvania, and Edwardsville, Pennsylvania.

He played for the Manhattan College football team from 1938 to 1940. He led the NCAA in passing yardage in 1940 with 1,190 yards.  He signed with the New York Giants of the NFL in July 1941.

Supulski later worked for the Wyoming Seminary. He died in 1985 at age 68.

See also
 List of college football yearly passing leaders

References

American football halfbacks
Manhattan Jaspers football players